Pierre R. Léon (March 12, 1926 – September 11, 2013) was a French-Canadian linguist and writer.

Life and career

Léon was born in Ligré, Touraine, France on March 12, 1926. He received a PhD from the University of Besançon in 1960 and a Doctor of Arts from the Sorbonne in 1972, where he also worked as an assistant professor. He was a research professor at the University of Besançon and taught at the University of Pau. He went on to teach at the University of Ohio and then at the University of Toronto, gaining professor emeritus status there. He founded the academic journals Studia Phonetica, 3L and Information et Communication. At U of T, he founded and headed the laboratory of phonetics research in the department of French Studies. He has written several important books on French linguistics. As a fiction writer, his authorship has earned him multiple accolades.

Death

Léon died of cancer on September 11, 2013 in Toronto, Ontario, Canada.

Selected publications

Fiction

 Les Voleurs d’étoiles de Saint-Arbroussepoil, Montreal, Leméac, 1982
 Pigou, Fiflard et compagnie, Winnipeg, Éditions des Plaines, 1993
 Sur la piste des Jolicoeur, Montreal, VLB, 1993
 L’Effrontée de Cuba, Toronto, GREF, 2007

Non-fiction

 With Parth Bhatt, Structure du français moderne, 1988 / 3rd edition, Canadian Scholars Press, 2005
 Phonétisme et prononciations du français, Paris, Nathan-Fac, 1992 / 3rd edition, 1998 / 4th edition, Armand-Colin, 2005 / 5th edition, Armand-Colin, 2007
 With Monique Léon, La prononciation du français, Paris, Nathan, 1997 / 2nd edition, Armand Colin, 2009

References

External links
 Pierre Léon - Notice Biographique (In Italian and French) by Laura Santone

1926 births
2013 deaths
Linguists from Canada
Linguists from France
20th-century Canadian male writers
21st-century Canadian male writers
Academic staff of the University of Toronto